Nexters is a Cypriot video game company, headquartered in Limassol, Cyprus. The company story dates back to 2010 when Andrey Fadeev and Boris Gertsovskiy met. The company is best known for the social and mobile games Throne Rush and Hero Wars. Nexters is one of the top five independent mobile game companies in Europe.

History 

In 2010 Andrey Fadeev was running Progrestar, a social games development studio, when he first met Boris Gertsovskiy, a future friend and fellow game developer.

By 2012, Gertsovskiy had become the President of Crazy Bit, also a social games development studio. Not long after, Crazy Bit and Progrestar began a partnership. Both teams moved into a new, shared office space and would regularly share best practices and hold cross-company events.

In 2013, Progrestar released Throne Rush, a strategy game, which ultimately became one of the most popular social games on Facebook and VK.

In 2014, Fadeev and Gertsovskiy decided to form Nexters. This led to Nexters' first release, Island Experiment, a casual game for social networks.

In 2016, Nexters established its new headquarters in Cyprus. At the same time, they also released Hero Wars, an action RPG. By 2018, Nexters decided to focus on mobile game development and scaling those games.

In the summer of 2018, the founders of Playrix, brothers Igor Bukhman and Dmitry Bukhman acquired a stake in Nexters.

Nexters generated $318 million in bookings and $120 million in free cash flow to equity (FCFE) in 2020. As of 2020, 35% of the company's net bookings came from the United States, 23% from Europe, and 19% from Asia Its flagship product, Hero Wars RPG, was downloaded 36 million times in 2020 on iOS and Android.

In February 2021, Nexters announced it would go public on the Nasdaq via a SPAC deal with Kismet Acquisition One Corp. The merger valued Nexters at $1.9 billion. On August 27, 2021, Nexters went public on Nasdaq under the ticker GDEV.

In 2021, in addition to the released Chibi Island at the end of the year the company soft-launched the new casual game Island Questaway. Nexters plans to launch a match-3-style game, Riddle Island  in 2022.

In January 2022, Nexters said it planned to acquire Cubic Games for $70M, 48.8% of MX Capital Limited (RJ Games) for $15M, and 49.5% of Castcrown Limited (Royal Ark) for $4.95M.

On February 28, 2022, Nasdaq, Inc., halted trading in the stock of Nexters, Inc. and four Russia-based companies listed on the Nasdaq exchange. The halts were due to regulatory concerns as the stock exchange seeks more information following economic sanctions imposed on Russia because of its invasion of Ukraine.

Games

References

External links 
 Official Website

Video game development companies
Companies established in 2014
Companies listed on the Nasdaq
Companies based in Limassol